Nantai is the largest island in the Min River of Fujian. It has the nickname "Island of Chinese snowballs and jade".

Nantai Island is wholly located in and forms the majority of Cangshan District, Fuzhou.

Geology
Around or before the Late Pleistocene, Nantai was only a rocky islet in the mouth of the Min River. The island continues to expand toward the northwest and southeast.

Geography
It is oblong, with a comparatively short north-south length and long east-west span.

References

Fuzhou
Islands of Fujian
River islands of China